Eurydice (Greek: Εὐρυδίκη), born Cleopatra (Greek: Κλεοπάτρα) was a mid-4th century BC Macedonian noblewoman, niece of Attalus, and last of the seven wives of Philip II of Macedon, but the first Macedonian one.

Biography 
Cleopatra was a maiden whom Philip married either in 338 or 337 BC and was his seventh wife. While Cleopatra was Philip's seventh wife she was his first Macedonian wife, and was wed as an alliance between the king and his general, Cleopatra's uncle, Attalus. As Philip's wife, Cleopatra was given the name "Eurydice". Although Philip was a polygamist, his marriage to Cleopatra greatly upset Olympias, his fourth wife and the mother of Alexander the Great, and threw Alexander's inheritance into question.

According to both Justin and Satyrus, Cleopatra Eurydice and Philip produced two children, Europa, a girl, and Caranus, a boy. Following Philip's assassination, both children were murdered by Olympias, whereupon Cleopatra took her own life, or her murder by Olympias was made to look like suicide. Peter Green strongly suggests that Alexander ordered the death of Caranus, but that the deaths of Europa and Cleopatra were the result of Olympias's vindictiveness. Attalus would also be killed in the aftermath of this succession.

References

Notes
Green, Peter; Alexander of Macedon: 356-323 B.C. A Historical Biography; Berkeley & Los Angeles; University of California Press; 1991.

External links
WCD Wiki Classical Dictionary - Cleopatra

4th-century BC births
4th-century BC deaths
Ancient Macedonian queens consort
Ancient Macedonians who committed suicide
Wives of Philip II of Macedon